John H. Merrifield (June 12, 1847 – December 29, 1906) was a Vermont politician who served as Speaker of the Vermont House of Representatives. Merrifield was a Republican.

Biography
John Hastings Merrifield was born in Newfane, Vermont on June 12, 1847.  He was educated at the common schools of Newfane and Springfield Wesleyan Seminary and became a farmer.

He also operated a general merchandise store for several years, and later worked as Station Agent for the Vermont line of the B & W Railroad.

Merrifield was associated with the Vermont House of Representatives for over 30 years, serving as engrossing clerk (1874–78), a member (1878–82, 1896), second assistant clerk (1882–88), first assistant clerk (1890), and clerk (1892–96). Merrifield served again as a member from 1902 to 1906 and was Speaker of the House.

He also held several town offices and was appointed county clerk for Windham County in 1897, serving until his death in Brattleboro on December 29, 1906. He was buried at Williamsville Cemetery in Williamsville.

References

External links

Biographical sketch from the Vermont Legislative Directory, Biennial Session, 1902

1847 births
1906 deaths
People from Newfane, Vermont
Republican Party members of the Vermont House of Representatives
Speakers of the Vermont House of Representatives
19th-century American politicians